Karagas is a rural locality (a selo) and the administrative centre of Karagassky Selsoviet, Nogaysky District, Republic of Dagestan, Russia. The population was 1,972 as of 2010. There are 21 streets.

Geography 
Karagas is located 59 km northwest of Terekli-Mekteb (the district's administrative centre) by road. Terekli-Mekteb is the nearest rural locality.

Nationalities 
Nogais live there.

References 

Rural localities in Nogaysky District, Dagestan